Doe Valley is an unincorporated community and census-designated place in Meade County, Kentucky, United States. Its population was 1,931 as of the 2010 census.

Doe Valley was originally conceived as a planned residential community in 1965.

Geography

Demographics

References

Unincorporated communities in Meade County, Kentucky
Unincorporated communities in Kentucky
Census-designated places in Meade County, Kentucky
Census-designated places in Kentucky